The rivière au Fusil (English: Rifle River) is a tributary of the Gulf of St. Lawrence, flowing in the municipality of L'Île-d'Anticosti, in the Minganie Regional County Municipality, in the administrative region of Côte-Nord, in province of Quebec, in Canada.

A network of forest roads serves this small valley. Forestry is the main economic activity in this area; second, recreational tourism activities.

Geography 

The Rivière au Fusil draws its source from the Étang Félice located in the center-west of the Anticosti Island. This source is located at:
  east of the town center of the village of Port-Menier;
  south of the north shore of Anticosti Island;
  northeast of the south shore of Anticosti Island.

  towards the south, forming a large curve with a diameter of approximately  oriented towards the east, successively crossing a series of small lakes whose the Wild Pond and the Goélands Pond, collecting the discharge (coming from the west) of a small lake, up to a bend in the river corresponding to a stream (coming from the north);
  towards the south, to the outlet (coming from the northeast) of two lakes including Lac au Fusil;
  towards the south, first forming a curve towards the west, until its mouth.

Toponymy 
The toponym "rivière au Fusil" is linked to that of "lac au Fusil" which is part of the same hydrographic slope.

This toponymic designation appeared in 1924 in the "Bulletin de la Société de Géographie de Québec", in the work "Monographie de l'Île d'Anticosti" written by Joseph Schmitt, published in 1904 and in 1955 on the map of the forestry company Consolidated Bathurst.

The toponym "rivière au Fusil" was made official on December 5, 1968, at the Place Names Bank of the Commission de toponymie du Québec.

See also 

 List of rivers of Quebec

References 

Rivers of Côte-Nord
Minganie Regional County Municipality
Anticosti Island